Mont-Saint-Bruno Provincial Park is a small national park of Quebec located near the municipality of Saint-Bruno-de-Montarville,  to the east of Montréal on the south shore of the Saint Lawrence River. The mountain is shared with the Ski Mont Saint-Bruno ski resort, a quarry and a small Canadian Forces (5th GSS) training camp. Despite its relatively small size, the mountain is known for its rich fauna and flora. Situated at the heart of the old signory of Montarville, its many lakes have permitted the construction and exploitation of many water mills, contributing to the region's economical success. A building from one of those mills, the "Vieux Moulin" (Old Mill), still stands to this day and is used as a rest area for skiers and hikers in different seasons.

At the beginning of the 20th century, the mountain became a luxury resort and a sought-after area for the food needs of various religious communities. One of those communities, the Brothers of Christian Instruction of St Gabriel, went as far as building a school and an arboretum for the benefit of the neighboring population. In 1976, the Government of Quebec acquired part of the mountain. It established a park in 1985 that, since 1999, is managed by the Société des établissements de plein air du Québec (SÉPAQ).

The park sees approximately  visitors yearly, where hiking, cross-country skiing and alpine skiing are amongst the most popular activities enjoyed.

Toponymy 
The park is named after mount Saint-Bruno, whose namesake is Saint-Bruno-de-Montarville, a municipality directly adjacent to the west flank of the mountain. The mount was known in the past as the "colline de Montarville" (hill of Montarville), from the name of the signory of Montarville. It was the establishment of the Saint-Bruno parish that provoked a gradual shift towards the current name. The parish itself was named as a tribute to the Bruneau family, its early financial contributors.

Geography 

Geology 

The composition and geological origin of mount Saint-Bruno is similar to that of the other Monteregian hills. Formed by an intrusion of magma in the earth's crust associated with a hotspot created by the opening of the atlantic ocean approximately 124 million years ago, the Monteregian hills have been exposed to the elements by the progressive erosion of their paleozoic sedimentary layers, which are softer than their core of metamorphic and igneous rocks that typically form plutons. Contrary to popular belief, they are not volcanoes.

The mountain owes its present rounded aspect to the last glaciation period and the grinding action of glacier movement. It was partially submerged by the Champlain sea, which has left shallow deposits of clay, sand, sandy gravel and gravel.

The massif's composition is mainly of peridotite accompanied by gabbro and syenite surrounded by shale and siltstone dating from the Ordovician (approximately 500 million years ago) and metamorphosed by the intrusion of magma.

Terrain 

Its highest summits are situated on its north-eastern flank and form an ellipse around the "lac des Bouleaux" (Birch Lake). Its outer terrain gradually recedes towards the south-east and is punctuated by water-filled dips.

Hydrography 
Despite its small size, the hydrographic network of the park is well developed. It comprises five lakes, one bog, two artificial ponds and many streams, all of them part of the Richelieu River watershed. The du Moulin, Seigneurial and des Bouleaux lakes are used for the municipal water supply of Saint-Bruno-de-Montarville.

Climate 
The climate of the Saint-Lawrence lowlands is moderate, subhumid and continental. It is a region in Quebec where the climate is the most clement.

Although the mountain stands at only , the conditions on the summit are a bit harsher than at the bottom, which in consequence causes altitudinal zonation. As the altitude increases, the vegetation passes from sugar maple, bitternut hickory at the base, to northern red oak, sugar maple on the summit.

Biology and ecology 
According to the ecological framework of Canada, the park is located in the ecoregion of the Saint-Lawrence lowlands. This region is the one that presents the most meridional climate of the Province. It is characterized by the presence of mixed forests dominated by the sugar maple, the yellow birch, the Canadian hemlock and the eastern white pine. Approximately 60% of the region is dedicated to intensive agriculture. Urbanization is also very important as it comprises Montréal, Québec City and Ottawa within its area.

Flora 

The Mont-Saint-Bruno park is home to 574 plant species, 20% of the documented total in the province. Below  of altitude, the park's forest is dominated by maple and bitternut hickory. Also found in the park are the  Canadian hemlock, the American hophornbeam, the yellow birch, the moosewood and the northern whitecedar.

24 plan species found in the park are threatened species. Those plants are:

Fauna

Mammals 
The park is frequented by 38 species of mammals. The sole great mammal found in the park is the white-tailed deer. The most common mammals are the eastern grey squirrel, the white-footed mouse, the eastern chipmunk and the groundhog. Three threatened species find home within the confines of the park, all of them bats: the silver-haired bat, the hoary bat and the eastern red bat.

Birds 
234 species of bird can be observed in Mont-Saint-Bruno National Park, which is 72% of all bird species represented in the province of Québec. Amongst them are many birds of prey such as the red-shouldered hawk, the Cooper's hawk, the eastern screech owl, the great horned owl, the barred owl, the northern goshawk, the broad-winged hawk, the red-tailed hawk and the American kestrel. Five threatened species of birds can be found in the park, the peregrine falcon, the sedge wren, the Cerulean warbler, the chimney swift and the common nighthawk.

Reptiles and amphibians 
Seven species of reptiles are present in the park (43% of the province's total), the common snapping turtle, the painted turtle, the northern map turtle, the common garter snake, the redbelly snake and the ringneck snake. Its amphibian population is composed of 14 (62% of the province's total) species, the eastern newt, the spotted salamander, the blue-spotted salamander, the four-toed salamander, the red-backed salamander, the American toad, the gray tree frog, the spring peeper, the wood frog, the leopard frog, the pickerel frog, the green frog, the mink frog and the bullfrog. Four of those species are threatened, the four-toed salamander, the pickerel frog, the northern map turtle and the ringneck snake.

Fishes 
13 species of fish have been counted in the park's lakes, the pumpkinseed, the smallmouth bass, the yellow perch, the white sucker, the brown bullhead, the golden shiner, the common carp, the black crappie, the goldfish, the bluntnose minnow, the tessellated darter, the rock bass and the blacknose shiner.

History 

No trace of indigenous occupation has been found in the park. However, it is likely that the territory was occupied during the archaic period beginning at least  years ago and continuing through the Sylvicole (1000 B.C. to 1500 A.D.) until the arrival of the French in the 16th century. The native indigenous culture associated with Mont-Saint-Bruno is that of the St. Lawrence Iroquoians, who disappeared around 1580.

In 1710, the seigneury of Montarville was conceded to Pierre Boucher, son of the neighboring seigneur of Boucherville. However, it was 30 years before the seigneury began to develop, due to a lack of navigable waterways in close enough proximity. Contrary to other seigneuries of the Montreal region, the seigneury of Saint-Bruno used water rather than wind to power its mills, which at one point numbered five and were all built between 1725 and 1816. Their hydraulic power was harnessed for grinding wheat, tanning leather, carding and spinning wool and sawing wood. The sole mill that is still standing to this day is the grain mill, rebuilt in 1761 on the site of the first mill. In 1825, the Boucher family sold the seigneury to François-Pierre Bruneau, a lawyer from Montreal who in turn passed it to his cousin, Olivier-Théophile (who was the first professor of anatomy at McGill University in 1851. On his death, in 1855, the seigneury ceased to exist.

In 1897, Edson Loy Pease, a rich banker from Montreal, acquired  of the mountain. In 1899, this terrain was sold to the Mount Bruno Association, an organization created to manage the domain in shared ownership, presided by Pease until his death in 1930. The association built 10 resorts between 1899 and 1940 that are now within the park. The Pease domain, located on the lac du Moulin, was destroyed by flames in 1941.

At the beginning of the 20th century, four religious communities, the Society of Jesus, the Trinitarian Order, the Congregation of the Sacred Hearts of Jesus and Mary and the Brothers of Christian Instruction of St Gabriel all purchased land parcels around the mountain to flee from Montreal's sprawling urbanization and to meet the food requirements of their schools. The Brothers of Saint-Gabriel would leave the greatest imprint on the mountain. They moved in 1912 close to the Villa Grand-Coteau, which was at that time the property of the Society of Jesus. In 1922, the latter sold the Brothers all their land in the area, including the villa. The acquisition became profitable very quickly, in part because of its apple orchards, and also because of its dairy production. In 1925, they constructed a seminary that became the most important school of this congregation in Québec. In 1930, they built a cemetery and in 1954, a grotto. The brothers finally sold all their land around Mount-Saint-Bruno to the government of Québec in 1976, and in 1990, the seminary was demolished. The apple orchard as well as an  arboretum, which at one point was home to 176 species of trees and bushes, are the sole remainders of this religious community's presence on the flanks of the mountain.

In 1965, the Ski Mont Saint-Bruno ski resort was opened. With time, the proximity of this resort to the urban region of Montreal has made Mont-Saint-Bruno a well known ski school.

Creation of the Park 

In 1969, the city of Saint-Bruno-de-Montarville acquired  of land in the mountain in order to protect the lakes that form its drinking water supply. Following requests to protect the mountain, the government of Québec purchased all the land in 1975 and 1976 to make the mountain a park and a fishing and hunting reserve. Public hearings were held in 1982 aimed at creating a provincial park. In 2001, the status of the park was modified, along with that of all other of Quebec's provincial park, to "parc national". Finally, on the 27th of July 2012, the government of Québec announced that the area of the park was to be increased to its limits established back in 2000. Limits over which the park had full administration rights, but were not officially part of its territory. This increase in land coverage included a mire and the main hills that the park was previously missing. A few more lots were again annexed to the park in 2013, giving it its current area.

Administration 
As is the case for Quebec's other national parks (with the exception of Pingualuit and Kuururjuaq national parks, which are administered by Nunavik parks), the Mont-Saint-Bruno national park has been administered by the Société des établissements de plein air du Québec (SÉPAQ) since 1999. The SÉPAQ oversees the provision of activities and services as well as park protection and promotion. The exploitation of natural resources for forestry, mining or energy production is forbidden, as it is in any other of Quebec's parks, and so are hunting, trapping and poaching. The passage of gas or oil pipelines is also forbidden in all parks except for existing installations.

Tourism 

The park is frequented by around  visitors yearly, which makes it the third most visited park of the province after the Gatineau Park and the Saguenay–St. Lawrence Marine Park. It is accessible year round but does not possess lodging infrastructure.

In summertime, it is possible to hike along a  network of trails, and to bike on the park's service roads. Between the months of August and October, the orchard is open for apple picking.

In wintertime, cross-country skiing and hiking are the preferred activities.

The Mont-Saint-Bruno national park, with Mont-Tremblant National Park and Mont-Orford National Park, is one of three national parks in Québec that is also home to an alpine skiing resort. Ski Mont Saint-Bruno is a small station that started operating in 1965. It is known for its large ski school, currently 562 teachers strong with an attendance of around  students. The resort has 15 ski slopes and is visited by  skiers per season.

See also 
 Mont Saint-Bruno
 Ski Mont Saint-Bruno
 List of protected areas in Quebec

References

Bibliography

External links
Parc national du Mont-Saint-Bruno - Official Site

National parks of Quebec
Saint-Bruno-de-Montarville
Tourist attractions in Montérégie
Saint-Bruno